ASD is the fifth studio album by American post-hardcore band A Skylit Drive, released on October 9, 2015, through Tragic Hero Records.

It is the only studio album without bassist and unclean vocalist, Brian White, and founding drummer and backing vocalist, Cory La Quay, who both left the band in 2014. They were respectively replaced by Michael Labelle and Brandon "Rage" Richter.

Track listing 
All lyrics written by Michael Jagmin, Nick Miller, Michael Labelle and Kit Walters, music by A Skylit Drive.

Personnel 
Michael "Jag" Jagmin - clean vocals
Nick Miller - lead guitar 
Michael Labelle - rhythm guitar, unclean vocals
Kyle Simmons - bass guitar, keyboards, programming
Brandon "Rage" Richter - drums, percussion

Charts

References

2015 albums
A Skylit Drive albums
Tragic Hero Records albums